The Falcon and the Co-eds is a 1943 film under the direction of William Clemens, and produced by Maurice Geraghty, the same team that had worked on The Falcon in Danger (1943) and would stay together for the next film in the Falcon series. The Falcon and the Co-eds was the seventh of 16 in the Falcon series. The story and screenplay was by Ardel Wray, a frequent collaborator with Val Lewton in his RKO horror series, who added supernatural elements to the proceedings.

As he had in the past three Falcon films, Tom Conway played the suave amateur sleuth, this time backed up by a bevy of young starlets, including Jean Brooks, Rita Corday and Amelita Ward.

Plot
Jane Harris (Amelita Ward), a student at the Bluecliff Seminary for Girls, asks Tom Lawrence (Tom Conway), aka the Falcon, for his help to investigate a death predicted by her unstable roommate, Marguerita Serena (Rita Corday), a clairvoyant. Professor Jamison has recently died. Was it suicide or homicide?

Posing as an insurance investigator, the Falcon meets the Dean, Miss Keyes (Barbara Brown); the school's Psychology teacher, Dr. Anatole Graelich (George Givot); the Drama teacher, Vicky Gaines (Jean Brooks); and the Music teacher, Mary Phoebus (Isabel Jewell). Inspector Donovan (Cliff Clark) and Detective Bates (Edward Gargan) are also looking at the local Coroner's verdict of suicide.

Tom begins his investigation at the dead professor's room, and then goes to the undertaker's (Ian Wolfe), where he finds out it is assumed Professor Jamison committed suicide by taking an overdose of sleeping pills. Believing the death was a murder, a group of suspects are carefully watched, including Marguerita, who thinks she has inherited her father's insanity, and a love triangle involving Graelich, Mary and Vicky, all with a motive to kill.

Before Tom can confront the killer, Dean Keyes is murdered; and, when Marguerita tells Mary that she saw her standing over the dead body of Miss Keyes, Mary tries to force the hysterical girl to jump from the cliffs by the school. Tom races to the cliffs and startles Mary, who topples over the cliffs to her death. She had been behind all the murders, starting with Jamison who was killed in a jealous rage, and the Dean, who would have dismissed Graelich, whom Mary had married in secret, as married couples could not work at the school.

When Jane's mother, a famous actress, arrives at the school with another actress, she asks the Falcon to solve a murder at the theater.

Cast

 Tom Conway as Tom Lawrence  
 Jean Brooks as Vicky Gaines  
 Rita Corday as Marguerita Serena  
 Amelita Ward as Jane Harris  
 Isabel Jewell as Mary Phoebus  
 George Givot as Dr. Anatole Graelich  
 Cliff Clark as Inspector Timothy Donovan  
 Edward Gargan as Detective Bates
 Barbara Brown as Miss Keyes
 Ruth Álvarez as First Ugh    
 Juanita Álvarez as Second Ugh  
 Nancy McCollum as Third Ugh  
 Patti Brill as Beanie Smith  
 Olin Howland as Bluecliff Driver 
 Dorothy Christy as Maya Harris 
 Dorothy Malone as Dorothy (credited as Dorothy Maloney)
 Ian Wolfe as The Undertaker
 Margie Stewart as Pan

Soundtrack
 Oh Dear What Can the Matter Be?(aka Johnny So Long at the Fair) (uncredited)TraditionalArranged by Dave DreyerSung by the Three Ughs - Nancy McCollum, Nita Hunter and Ruth Álvarez
 Can't Take the Brooklyn Out of Me(uncredited)Sung by Amelita Ward
 I Get The Neck Of The ChickenWritten by Frank Loesser and Jimmy McHugh

Production
Principal photography on The Falcon and the Co-eds took place from August 17 to mid-September 1943. The growing popularity of the Falcon series led to filming two films nearly back-to-back, with the previous film in the series, The Falcon In Danger, which was in production, April 13 to early-May 1943. The last scene in the earlier film foretells the Falcon accepting a job to help a pretty co-ed, setting up the story of The Falcon and the Co-eds.

Amusingly, the title is a misnomer. Since Bluecliff is an all-girls school, the students are by definition not co-eds.

Reception
Film historians Richard Jewell and Vernon Harbin described The Falcon and the Co-eds as handicapped by a "twisting and turning narrative" that revealed a "sloppiness". In a recent review for the Time Out Film Guide, Tom Milne wrote, "Despite the off-putting title, an attractive little thriller in which the Falcon investigates murder in a girls' school, where an atmosphere of fear and loathing centres on a girl with second sight, while she herself is driven to suicidal despair by her predictions of murder. Scripted by Ardel Wray, who worked regularly with Val Lewton (I Walked with a Zombie, The Leopard Man, Isle of the Dead), it is beautifully characterized and has some vividly eerie touches (better exploited in Roy Hunt's camerawork than by Clemens' direction). It's one of the best in a series ..."

References

Notes

Citations

Bibliography

 Bansak, Edmund G. Fearing the Dark: The Val Lewton Career. Jefferson, North Carolina: McFarland & Company, 2003. .
 Jewell, Richard and Vernon Harbin. The RKO Story. New Rochelle, New York: Arlington House, 1982. .
 Pym, John, ed. Time Out Film Guide. London: Time Out Guides Limited, 2004. .

External list
 
 
 
 

1943 films
RKO Pictures films
1943 crime drama films
American black-and-white films
American crime drama films
The Falcon (film character) films
1940s American films
1940s English-language films